William Andrew Johnston (1871–1929) was an American journalist, author, and co-founder, with George T. Delacorte Jr., of Dell Publishing.

Personal
Johnston was born in Pittsburgh, Pennsylvania on January 26, 1871, the son of William Andrew and Agnes (Parry) Johnston. He graduated with a Litt.D from Western University of Pennsylvania (now the University of Pittsburgh) in 1891, where he was valedictorian. Soon after graduation, he moved to New York City and took a job at the New York World newspaper, where he worked for 27 years.

In 1921 he co-founded Dell Publishing. In 1927 he moved to Chicago, becoming vice-president of public relations for Celotex Corporation.

Johnston was married twice, first in 1896, to Hazel Minnette Williams of Hampshire, England, and second, in 1910, to Hattie Belle McCollum (1883-1963). of Lockport, New York He had a son, George E. Johnston.

He died in Chicago on February 16, 1929, at age 58.

Publications
According to The New York Times''', "most of Mr. Johnston's books were written from his experience as a reporter." He is best known for his books Limpy, the Boy Who Felt Neglected (1917), based on his own disability,  and The Fun of Being a Fat Man (1922), again based on his life experience, in reaction to a book by Henri Beraud called The Tragedy of Being Fat (Le Martyre de l'obèse). He wrote a series of articles for Collier's from 1925-26, on the theme "if I were a...", such as  "If I Were a Business Man", "If I Were a Clergyman", "If I Were a Doctor", "If I Were a Lawyer", "If I Were a Rich Man", "If I Were Out of a Job". He also wrote a number of detective stories, and non-fiction.

Fiction
 The Innocent Murders (1910)
 Solomon Sloan's Advice on how to Run the Universe The Yellow Letter (1911) free eBook
 Limpy, the Boy Who Felt Neglected (1917) free eBook
 The House of Whispers (1918) free eBook 
 The Apartment Next Door (1919) free eBook
 The Mystery in the Ritsmore (1920) free eBook
 The Fun of Being a Fat Man (1922) 
 The Tragedy at the Beach Club (1922)
 The Waddington Cipher (1923)
 These Women (1923)
 The Accidental Accomplice (1928)

Non-fiction
 History up to date (1899), History of the Spanish-American War
 My Own Main Street (1921) free eBook at The Hathi Trust
 Webster's Bridge'' (1924) - with H. T. Webster

References

External links
 William_Andrew_Johnston at Goodreads
 

1871 births
1929 deaths
American writers
Writers from Pittsburgh
University of Pittsburgh alumni